Epidermal growth factor receptor kinase substrate 8 is an enzyme that in humans is encoded by the EPS8 gene.

Function 

This gene encodes a member of the EPS8 family. This protein contains one PH domain and one SH3 domain. It functions as part of the EGFR pathway, though its exact role has not been determined. Highly similar proteins in other organisms are involved in the transduction of signals from Ras to Rac and growth factor-mediated actin remodeling. Alternate transcriptional splice variants of this gene have been observed but have not been thoroughly characterized.

Clinical significance 

Mutations in EPS8 cause congenital deafness.

Interactions 

EPS8 has been shown to interact with:

 ABI1,
 BAIAP2, 
 DVL1, 
 SHB, 
 SHC1 
 SOS1,  and
 Src.

References

Further reading